Sakušak (in older sources also Sakošak) is a settlement in the Slovene Hills in the Municipality of Juršinci in northeastern Slovenia. The area is part of the traditional region of Styria. It is now included with the rest of the municipality in the Drava Statistical Region.

The inventor Johann Puch was born in the village in 1862. The house in which he was born, Sakušak no. 79, has been included by the Slovenian Ministry of Culture on their list of heritage locations.

References

External links
Sakušak on Geopedia

Populated places in the Municipality of Juršinci